Sally Hawkins is an English actress. Beginning her collaboration with  Mike Leigh on  All or Nothing in 2002, she would also appear in Vera Drake (2004) and star as Poppy Cross in Happy-Go-Lucky (2008). Her breakout role, Hawkins would win several awards for her performance, including the Golden Globe Award for Best Actress in a Motion Picture – Musical or Comedy.

In 2005, Hawkins co-starred in the BBC mini-series Fingersmith, playing a Victorian thief who falls in love with the woman she is conning. For her performance in the romantic drama Blue Jasmine (2013), Hawkins earned a nomination for the Academy Award for Best Supporting Actress. She would garner another Academy Award nomination for starring as a mute cleaning woman in the American romantic supernatural film The Shape of Water (2017).

Other notable performances include as the leads in Made in Dagenham (2010) and Maudie (2016) in addition to appearing in franchise films Paddington (2014) and Paddington 2 (2017) as Mrs Brown, and as Vivienne Graham in Godzilla (2014) and Godzilla: King of the Monsters (2019).

Filmography

Film

Television

Theatre

Radio

References

External links
 Sally Hawkins at the Internet Movie Database

Actress filmographies
British filmographies